KHCAA Golden Jubilee Chamber Complex is a Chambers building of the Kerala High Court Advocates Association in the city of Kochi in the state of Kerala, India.

Location
It is located in Kochi on the western (sea) side of the Kerala High Court building.

Construction
The foundation stone was laid by the Chief Justice of India, K. G. Balakrishnan on 8 November 2008. Pile foundation was commenced on 23 November 2008, and 120 nos. RCC piles were completed in 45 days.

Architecture
On the eastern and western sides of the building, two fins on each side (with cantilever beams and aerocon blocks in between and texture in black colour) have been provided for aesthetic beauty and structural reasons. On the southern side, a benchmark design in the form of an "A" resting on a projected beam is symbolic of an Advocate's Collar and Band. This building is one of the first fully FTTH enabled buildings in the State of Kerala.

Facilities
 Parking slots for 38 cars
 A Conference Hall
 Two Banks with ATM
 The Chamber Committee office
 Cafeteria
 Reference-cum-cyber library
 540 impendent chambers
 Fully FTTH Enabled by BSNL
 3 High Speed Modern Lifts
 Indian Coffee House

Safety
The building is earthquake resistant. 120 piles of average depth of 43.5 M provide a stable foundation. The lift wall has been provided with double reinforcement. Large number of columns with heavy beams, cross beams and tie beams add safety to the whole structure.

External links
 Chamber complex for advocates inaugurated 
 KHCAA jubilee complex inaugurated 

Buildings and structures in Kochi
Buildings and structures completed in 2010